Susanne Bobzien  (born 1960) is a German-born philosopher whose research interests focus on philosophy of logic and language, determinism and freedom, and ancient philosophy. She currently is senior research fellow at All Souls College, Oxford and professor of philosophy at the University of Oxford.

Early life
Bobzien was born in Hamburg, Germany, in 1960. She graduated in 1985 with an M.A. at Bonn University, and in 1993 with a doctorate in philosophy (D.Phil.) at Oxford University, where from 1987–1989 she was affiliated with Somerville College.

Academic career
Bobzien currently holds the position of senior research fellow at All Souls College, Oxford and is professor of philosophy at Oxford University. She was appointed to a senior professorship in philosophy at Yale in 2001 and held this position from 2002 to 2010. From 1993 to 2002 she had a tenured position at Oxford University. From 1990 to 2002, she was fellow and praelector in philosophy at The Queen's College. Before that she was tutorial fellow in philosophy at Balliol College.

Among her awards are a British Academy Research Readership (2000–2002), and a fellowship of the National Endowment for the Humanities (2008–09). In 2014 she was elected a Fellow of the British Academy, the United Kingdom's national academy for the humanities and social sciences. Bobzien has published several books and numerous articles in leading academic journals and collections.

Philosophical work

Determinism and freedom
Bobzien's major work Determinism and Freedom in Stoic Philosophy  is "the first full-scale modern study of the [Stoic] theory [of determinism]". "It explores ... the views of the Stoics on causality, fate, the modalities, divination, rational agency, the non-futility of action, moral responsibility, [and the] formation of character". In this book and in her articles "The Inadvertent Conception and Late Birth of the Free-Will Problem" and "Did Epicurus discover the Free-Will Problem?" Bobzien argues that the problem of determinism and free-will, as conceived in contemporary philosophy, was not considered by Aristotle, Epicurus or the Stoics, as was previously thought, but only in the 2nd century CE, as the result of a conflation of Stoic and Aristotelian theory.

Bobzien's "Die Kategorien der Freiheit bei Kant" (The Categories of Freedom in Kant) has been described as an article "that has long been the starting point for any German reader seeking to deepen his understanding of the second chapter of the Analytic of Kant's Critique of Practical Reason." It differentiates the main functions of Kant's Categories of Freedom: as conditions of the possibility for actions (i) to be free, (ii) to be comprehensible as free and (iii) to be morally evaluated.

History of logic
Bobzien's Die stoische Modallogik is the first monograph on Stoic modal logic. In her paper "Stoic Syllogistic" Bobzien sets out the evidence for Stoic syllogistic. She argues that this should not be assimilated into standard propositional calculus, but treated as a distinct system which bears important similarities to relevance logic and connexive logic. In "Stoic Sequent Logic and Proof Theory", she argues that stoic deduction resembles backward proof search for Gentzen-style substructural sequent logics as developed in structural proof theory, and in the co-authored "Stoic Logic and Multiple Generality" she lays out evidence that Stoic logic could handle the problem of multiple generality in a variable-free first-order logic.

Bobzien's paper "The Development of Modus Ponens in Antiquity" traces the earliest development of modus ponens (or Law of Detachment). She has also reconstructed the ancient history of hypothetical syllogisms and Galen's representation of peripatetic hypothetical syllogistic, and shown these differ from stoic syllogistic and contemporary propositional logic.

In the 2021 extended essay "Frege plagiarized the Stoics", based on her 2016 Keeling Lecture, Bobzien argues in detail that Frege plagiarized them on a large scale in his work on the philosophy of logic and language, written mainly between 1890 and his death in 1925.

Vagueness and paradoxes
Bobzien has worked on the philosophical application of the modal logic S4.1 to vagueness and paradoxes. She has introduced and developed the philosophical ideas of columnar higher-order vagueness, borderline nestings, and semi-determinability.

In "Gestalt Shifts in the Liar", presented in her 2017 Jacobsen Lecture, Bobzien analyses three features of liar sentences and shows how their combination leads to the liar's paradoxicality: salience-based bistability, context sensitivity, and assessment sensitivity. On this basis she proposes the modal logic S4.1 as governing the truth operator and offers a revenge-free solution to the liar paradox that relates to Herzberger's revision theory of truth.

Bobzien has proposed a logic of higher-order vagueness (the quantified modal logic S4.1 supplemented with Max Cresswell's Finality Axiom) that delivers a generic solution to the Sorites paradox and avoids higher-order vagueness paradoxes and sharp boundaries. The proposed logic is weaker than classical logic and stronger than intuitionistic logic. It is a modal companion to the superintuitionistic logic QH+KF.

Selected publications
Determinism and freedom
Determinism and Freedom in Stoic Philosophy (Oxford 1998). 
[https://books.google.com/books?id=JxUuEAAAQBAJ Freedom, and Moral Responsibility: Essays in Ancient Philosophy] (Oxford 2021). 
"The Inadvertent Conception and Late Birth of the Free-Will Problem" (Phronesis 43, 1998)
"Did Epicurus Discover the Free-Will Problem?" (Oxford Studies in Ancient Philosophy 19, 2000)
"Die Kategorien der Freiheit bei Kant" (in Kant: Analysen-Probleme-Kritik vol. 1, Würzburg, 1988)

History of logicDie stoische Modallogik (Würzburg 1986). Alexander of Aphrodisias: On Aristotle Prior Analytics 1.1-7, with J. Barnes, K. Flannery, K. Ierodiakonou (London 1991). 
"Stoic Syllogistic" (Oxford Studies in Ancient Philosophy 14, 1996). 
"The Development of Modus Ponens in Antiquity" (Phronesis 47, 2002)
"Stoic Sequent Logic and Proof Theory" (History and Philosophy of Logic 40, 2019) 
“Stoic Logic and Multiple Generality”, with Simon Shogry (Philosophers’ Imprint 20, 2020)
"Frege Plagiarized the Stoics" (in Themes in Plato, Aristotle, and Hellenistic Philosophy: Keeling Lectures 2011-18, London 2021)

Vagueness and paradoxes
"Higher-order Vagueness, Radical Unclarity, and Absolute Agnosticism" (Philosophers' Imprint 10, 2010)
"In Defense of True Higher-Order Vagueness" (Synthese 180, 2011)
"If it's Clear, then it's Clear that it's Clear, or is it? – Higher-Order Vagueness and the S4 Axiom" (Oxford 2012)
"Higher-Order Vagueness and Borderline Nestings – a Persistent Confusion" (Analytic Philosophy 54.1, 2013).
"Columnar Higher-order Vagueness or Vagueness is Higher-Order Vagueness" (Aristotelian Society Suppl. 89, 2015)
"Gestalt Shifts in the Liar or Why KT4M is the Logic of Semantic Modalities" (in Reflections on the Liar, Oxford 2017)
"Intuitionism and the Modal Logic of Vagueness", with Ian Rumfitt (Journal of Philosophical Logic'' 49, 2020)

See also
Free will in antiquity#Epicureanism
Stoic logic
Stoicism

References

External links

Homepage at All Souls College, Oxford
Women in Logic

20th-century British philosophers
20th-century German philosophers
21st-century British philosophers
21st-century German philosophers
Yale University faculty
German scholars of ancient Greek philosophy
Philosophers of language
German women philosophers
Living people
1960 births
Fellows of the British Academy
Fellows of All Souls College, Oxford
Alumni of Somerville College, Oxford
20th-century German women